Bucha is a village in Bucha Raion of Kyiv Oblast, Ukraine. It belongs to Dmytrivka rural hromada, one of the hromadas of Ukraine.

History

In 1900, Bucha was located in the Belogorodskaya Volost of Kievsky Uyezd of Kiev Governorate. It was located 31 miles from Kyiv, had 15 parishes, 4 yards and 20 residents. Bucha is also near the Kiev-Zhytomyr highway, Boyarka railway station and Kyiv steamship station. There are 205 acres of land in the village, which belonged to landowner Ivan Matviyovych Musa.

Until 18 July 2020, Bucha was located in Kyiv-Sviatoshyn Raion. The raion was abolished that day as part of the administrative reform of Ukraine, which reduced the number of raions of Kyiv Oblast to seven. The area of Kyiv-Sviatoshyn Raion was split between Bucha, Fastiv, and Obukhiv Raions, with Bucha being transferred to Bucha Raion.

Demographics
Native language as of the Ukrainian Census of 2001:
 Ukrainian 92.36%
 Russian 7.64%

References

Villages in Bucha Raion